Dread is a horror RPG published by The Impossible Dream.  The game uses a Jenga tower for action resolution.

The game

Dread is a horror game, commonly played as a one-shot at conventions.  It can also be used for ongoing gaming, though in practice this is less common. In order to play you need:
 One Jenga tower or equivalent
 3-6 players
 3–5 hours (can be extended to multiple sessions of similar length)
 A prepared adventure and character sheets

The setting

Dread has no fixed setting - instead you can use it for any horror setting where it is expected that most of the characters will not survive through the session.  The examples in the Dread rulebook are Beneath A Full Moon - survival horror, Beneath A Metal Sky - sci-fi, and Beneath The Mask - based on a slasher film and in which not even the GM knows which of the PCs is the killer at the start (they all have reasons to not know they are).

Character creation involves each character in the game being assigned a part (in Beneath the Mask there are the Jock, the Head Cheerleader, the Nerd, the Slacker, the Rich Kid, and the Best Friend) and each part coming with about a dozen questions, the final one being "What is your name?"  Most of the questions are deliberately loaded, for example "Why do you intend to convince the others to split up whenever the opportunity arises, despite the recent events?"

System

Dread uses a very simple system.  When you try to take a challenging action pull one or more blocks from the tower (a stack of blocks, such as Jenga or the like), as dictated by the GM.  If you pull and succeed you succeed in your action.  If you knock the tower over your player character is out of the game, usually due to dying - or if there is no sensible narrative way for that to happen (for instance a knock over by spilling your drink) they are the "walking dead", unable to pull any more blocks and subject to death or removal at the next plausible or dramatic opportunity.

Reviews of the game praise the "lethal suspense" of the game and its innovation, but note that it's useful only for horror gaming and one shot games.

In May 2015, Dread was featured as a two-part episode on TableTop. Wil Wheaton in the introduction praised Dread's "very innovative device to build up tension and really put the scare in players".

In March 2019, Dread & its co-creator Epidiah Ravachol was featured on the ProudGamers podcast, The ProudTable. Epidiah speaks about his inspirations behind the game.

Reception
Dread was the winner of the 2006 Ennie Award for Innovation as well as being nominated for Best Game and Best Rules.

References

External links 
 

ENnies winners
Horror role-playing games
Indie role-playing games
Open-source tabletop games
Role-playing games introduced in 2005